Felicia Chester (born March 24, 1988) is a basketball player who most recently played for the Chicago Sky of the Women's National Basketball Association.

DePaul statistics
Source

WNBA
Chester was selected in the second round of the 2011 WNBA Draft (14th overall) by the Minnesota Lynx. She was then traded to Atlanta. She was waived before the season, but New York signed her on July 4, 2011.

References

External links
DePaul bio 

Living people
1988 births
American women's basketball players
Basketball players from St. Louis
DePaul Blue Demons women's basketball players
Forwards (basketball)
Minnesota Lynx draft picks
New York Liberty players